Riccardo Cerini (born 18 October 2000) is an Italian professional footballer who plays as a defender for Serie D club Ponte San Pietro.

Club career
On 27 September 2020, Cerini made his debut in Serie C for AlbinoLeffe. On 31 August 2021, Cerini left AlbinoLeffe by mutual consent.

On 6 September 2021, he returned to San Pietro on Serie D.

References

External links

2000 births
Living people
Italian footballers
Association football defenders
Serie C players
Serie D players
A.C. Ponte San Pietro Isola S.S.D. players
U.C. AlbinoLeffe players